Xi'an Wolves Football Club is a defunct Chinese football club that participated in the China League Two. The team was based in Xi'an, Shaanxi.

History
Xi'an Daxing Chongde Football Club was established on 8 March 2018 by football fan Yang Xiaolong, who in the previous year has taken over Xi'an Anxinyuan and participated in 2017 China Amateur Football League. For the club's first-year campaign in 2018 Chinese Champions League, they managed to finish 1st in the group stage after winning its first 3 debut matches, and advanced to the national play-off stage after beating Xi'an Huilong by tying 1–1 with them in regular time and winning 3–0 in penalties in the group stage play-off. Although they lost both rounds to Shanxi Metropolis in the first round of the national play-offs and was ranked the last, the team was later admitted into 2019 China League Two in order to fill vacancy created by withdrawn team.

Ahead of the 2021 season, they changed their name to Xi'an Wolves F.C..

The club was dissolved after 2021 season.

Name history
 2018–2020 Xi'an Daxing Chongde F.C.  西安大兴崇德
 2021 Xi'an Wolves F.C.  西安骏狼

Results
All-time league rankings

As of the end of 2019 season.

 in North Group.

Key
<div>

 Pld = Played
 W = Games won
 D = Games drawn
 L = Games lost
 F = Goals for
 A = Goals against
 Pts = Points
 Pos = Final position

 DNQ = Did Not Qualify
 DNE = Did Not Enter
 NH = Not Held
 WD = Withdrawal
 – = Does Not Exist
 R1 = Round 1
 R2 = Round 2
 R3 = Round 3
 R4 = Round 4

 F = Final
 SF = Semi-finals
 QF = Quarter-finals
 R16 = Round of 16
 Group = Group stage
 GS2 = Second Group stage
 QR1 = First Qualifying Round
 QR2 = Second Qualifying Round
 QR3 = Third Qualifying Round

References

External links
 Official Weibo
Soccerway

Defunct football clubs in China
Association football clubs established in 2018
Association football clubs disestablished in 2022
Sport in Shaanxi
2018 establishments in China
2022 disestablishments in China